Zone 83 is a zone of the municipality of Al Rayyan in the state of Qatar. The main district recorded in the 2015 population census was Al Karaana. 

Other districts which fall within its administrative boundaries are Al Rekayya, Baida Al Gaa, Jariyan Al Batnah, Jaww Basheer, and Umm Al Suwab.

Demographics
As of the 2010 census, the zone comprised 177 housing units and 95 establishments. There were 1,567 people living in the zone, of which 87% were male and 13% were female. Out of the 1,567 inhabitants, 87% were 20 years of age or older and 13% were under the age of 20. The literacy rate was 93.7%.

Employed persons made up 84% of the total population. Females accounted for 6% of the working population, while males accounted for 94% of the working population.

Land use
The Ministry of Municipality and Environment (MME) breaks down land use in the zone as follows.

References 

Zones of Qatar
Al Rayyan